John Sebastian LaRocca (December 19, 1901 – December 3, 1984) was the Sicilian-born American boss of the Pittsburgh crime family from the 1950s until his death in 1984.

Born in Villarosa, Sicily, LaRocca and his family immigrated to the United States in 1910, settling in Indiana County, Pennsylvania. As a young man, LaRocca went to work in the coal mines. In 1922, at age 20, he was arrested for assaulting a young woman and sentenced to three years in state prison.

In 1956, LaRocca succeeded longtime crime boss Frank Amato as head of criminal operations in Pittsburgh and Southwestern Pennsylvania. LaRocca and two of his captains, Gabriel "Kelly" Mannarino and Michael James Genovese, were among the 100+ Mafiosi who attended the legendary Apalachin Meeting in 1957.

LaRocca was considered by many to be the most successful of all Pittsburgh godfathers. He worked closely with several bosses including Carlo Gambino of New York City, Angelo Bruno of Philadelphia, Russell Bufalino of Pittston, Nick Civella of Kansas City and Santo Trafficante Jr. of Tampa. LaRocca, Mannarino and Trafficante were partners in the Sans Souci hotel and gambling casino in Havana, Cuba.

LaRocca remained boss until his death from natural causes on December 3, 1984, at age 82.

Further reading
Moldea, Dan E. The Hoffa Wars. New York: Charter Books, 1978. 
Scott, Peter Dale. Deep Politics and the Death of JFK. Berkeley: University of California Press, 1993. 
Pennsylvania Crime Commission. St. Davids, Pennsylvania: DIANE Publishing, 1984.

References
Sifakis, Carl. The Mafia Encyclopedia. New York: Da Capo Press, 2005.

External links
The American "Mafia" - Pittsburgh Bosses
Mafia has long history here, growing from bootlegging days by Torsten Ove
New York Times: Figure in Pennsylvania Crime Dies at 82 in His Bed at Home
The Mafia Made Easy Peter J. Devico (June 5, 2007)

1901 births
1984 deaths
Italian emigrants to the United States
American gangsters of Sicilian descent
American crime bosses
People from Indiana County, Pennsylvania